Lincoln High School may refer to:

Costa Rica
Lincoln School (Costa Rica), San José, Costa Rica

New Zealand
Lincoln High School (New Zealand), Christchurch, New Zealand

United States

Alabama 
Lincoln Normal School, Marion, Alabama

Arkansas 
Lincoln High School (Lincoln, Arkansas)
Lincoln High School (Fort Smith, Arkansas), segregated black school operating between 1892 and 1966

California 
Lincoln High School (Lincoln, California)
Lincoln High School (San Diego, California)
Lincoln High School (Stockton, California)

Florida 
Lincoln High School (Gainesville, Florida)
Lincoln High School (Riviera Beach, Florida), defunct segregated black school in the School District of Palm Beach County
Lincoln High School (Tallahassee, Florida)
Old Lincoln High School, Tallahassee, Florida

Idaho 
Lincoln High School (Idaho Falls, Idaho)

Illinois 
East St. Louis Lincoln High School, East St. Louis, Illinois, consolidated in 1998
Lincoln Community High School, Lincoln, Illinois

Indiana 
Vincennes Lincoln High School, Vincennes, Indiana
Lincoln Senior High School (Cambridge City, Indiana)

Kansas 
 Lincoln Junior and Senior High School, Lincoln Center, Kansas

Kentucky 

 Lincoln High School, Paducah, Kentucky

Maine 
Lincoln High School (Maine), Lincoln, Maine, now Mattanawcook Academy

Maryland 
Lincoln High School (Maryland), Rockville, segregated black school renamed George Washington Carver in 1951

Massachusetts 
Lincoln-Sudbury Regional High School, Sudbury

Michigan 
Lincoln High School (Warren, Michigan)
Lincoln High School (Ypsilanti, Michigan)

Missouri 
Lincoln High School (Kansas City, Missouri), renamed Lincoln College Preparatory Academy in 1986

Nebraska 
Lincoln High School (Lincoln, Nebraska)
Lincoln East High School, Lincoln, Nebraska
Lincoln North Star High School, Lincoln, Nebraska
Lincoln Northeast High School, Lincoln, Nebraska
Lincoln Southeast High School, Lincoln, Nebraska
Lincoln Southwest High School, Lincoln, Nebraska

New Jersey 
Lincoln High School (New Jersey), Jersey City, New Jersey

New York 
Lincoln High School (Yonkers, New York)

North Carolina 
Lincoln High School (Chapel Hill, North Carolina), segregated black school

Ohio 
Lincoln High School (Canton, Ohio)
Lincoln High School (Gahanna, Ohio)

Oregon 
Lincoln High School (Portland, Oregon)

Pennsylvania 
Lincoln High School (Ellwood City, Pennsylvania)

South Carolina 
Lincoln High School (McClellanville, South Carolina)
Lincoln High School (Sumter, South Carolina)

South Dakota 
Lincoln High School (South Dakota), Sioux Falls, South Dakota

Texas 
Lincoln High School (Dallas)
Lincoln High School (Palestine, Texas), listed on the NRHP in Anderson County, Texas

West Virginia 
Lincoln High School (West Virginia), Shinnston, West Virginia

Washington 
Lincoln High School (Tacoma, Washington)
Lincoln High School (Seattle, Washington)

Wisconsin 
Lincoln High School (Alma Center, Wisconsin), see List of high school athletic conferences in Wisconsin#Dairyland Conference
Lincoln High School (Manitowoc, Wisconsin)
Lincoln High School (Milwaukee, Wisconsin)

See also
Lincoln School (disambiguation)
Lincoln County High School (disambiguation)
Lincoln Park High School (disambiguation)
Abraham Lincoln High School (disambiguation)